George Mackay or Mckay may refer to:

 George Leslie Mackay (1844–1901), Canadian missionary
 George MacKay (rower) (1900–1972), Canadian rower
 George Chisholm MacKay (1898–1973), Canadian World War I pilot
 George Mackay (Australian politician) (1872–1961), Speaker of the Australian House of Representatives
 George McKay (Australian politician) (1819–1898), New South Wales colonial politician
 George McKay (actor) (1884–1945), Russian-American actor
 George Mackay (cricketer) (1860–1948), Australian cricketer
 George Mackay of Skibo (c. 1715–1782), Scottish soldier and MP for Sutherland 1747–61
 George Prevost McKay (1840–1924), Ontario businessman and political figure
 George Frederick McKay (1899–1970), American composer
 George Mackay, 3rd Lord Reay (1678–1748), Scottish noble
 George Mackay, 5th Lord Reay (1735–1768)
 George Mackay (rugby union) (1906–1981), Australian rugby union player
 George McKay (rugby union), Australian rugby union player
 George William Mackay (1882–1969), Canadian missionary in Taiwan
 George Mackay (surgeon) (1861–1949), British ophthalmic Surgeon
 George MacKay (actor) (born 1992), English actor

See also
 George Mackay Brown (1921–1996), Scottish poet, author and dramatist
 George Mackey (1916–2006), American mathematician
 George Mackie (disambiguation)